Municipal corporations or municipalities (also known as pourasabha) are the local governing bodies of the cities and towns in Bangladesh. There are 330 such municipal corporations in eight divisions of Bangladesh. A municipal corporation serving a town may be called a town council, and a municipal corporation serving a city is styled a city council; these bodies are divided into wards, which are further divided into mauzas and mahallas. Direct elections are held for each ward, electing a chairperson and a number of members. The municipal heads are elected for a span of five years.

Overview

List of municipalities by province/division

See also 
 List of city corporations in Bangladesh
 List of cities and towns in Bangladesh

References

 
 
Pourashavas of Bangladesh
Bangladesh geography-related lists
Lists of municipalities
Lists of subdivisions of Bangladesh